Thomas Bramston may refer to:

Thomas Bramston (1658–1737), MP for Maldon, 1712–1727
Thomas Bramston (died 1765) (c. 1690–1765), MP for Maldon
Thomas Gardiner Bramston (1770–1831), English politician, Member of Parliament (MP) for Essex, son of Thomas Berney Bramston and father of Thomas William Bramston
Thomas Berney Bramston (1733–1813), British MP for Essex
Thomas William Bramston (1796–1871), British MP for South Essex, 1835–1865